The Scipio Town Hall, on N. State St. in Scipio, Utah, is a PWA Moderne-style city hall building built in 1935 as a New Deal public works project.  It was listed on the National Register of Historic Places in 1988.

Two brick and stonemasons who worked on the project were Will Critchley and Lew Critchley.

It was converted to serve as a senior citizen center in 1985–86.

References

City and town halls in Utah
National Register of Historic Places in Millard County, Utah
PWA Moderne architecture in Utah
Buildings and structures completed in 1935